Cambooya is a rural town and locality in the Toowoomba Region, Queensland, Australia. In the  the locality of Cambooya had a population of 1,584 people.

Geography 

Outside of the town, the land use is a mix of dry and irrigated crop-growing and grazing on native vegetation.

History

European settlement of the area dates from 1840, when Arthur Hodgson chose  of prime land, which he named Eton Vale. In 1843 the New South Wales Commissioner of Crown Lands, Christopher Rolleston, carried out a survey and reserved a site on Eton Vale for a township. He named it Cambooya. The origin of the name is unclear. It has been suggested it is a rendering of the Aboriginal word yambuya meaning tubers growing in a water hole. Another theory is that it derives from the Aboriginal word kambuya meaning an egg, skull or head or that it means reeds and rushes, or many winds.

Cambooya was, in its early years, the railway, postal, and general centre of two properties named after two public schools of England, Eton and Harrow. Hodgson had attended Eton, and Ramsay had attended Harrow. Hodgson resisted the formation of a township, and no development occurred until 1868, when the Cambooya railway station  was built as the Southern railway line was extended from Toowoomba to Warwick.

Cambooya Post Office opened on 12 March 1869. It was co-located with the railway station.

In 1877,  of land was resumed from the Eton Vale pastoral run to establish smaller farms. The land was offered for selection on 17 April 1877.

Cambooya Provisional School opened on 30 October 1882, with 12 students from four local families. Due to growing attendance and an increased population caused by the railway, the school was moved and a building was erected in 1899 at the current school site. On 1 January 1909 it became Cambooya State School, resulting in a new state school building being built in 1910 with the provisional school building then becoming the teacher's residence in 1910.

Eton Vale school was originally a private school on Eton Vale Station, three and a half miles from the Cambooya railway station. Most children who attended the school in 1890 were girls and infants, as they could not travel to Cambooya School with any regularity and the black soil was impassable in wet weather. Eton Vale became a half-time school with Preston in 1925; Preston School closed shortly after and Eton Vale school closed in 1929.

Harrow State School opened on 24 June 1909 and closed in 1927. Its localtion was describe as "via Cambooya".

All Saints Anglican Church was consecrated on 1 November 1904 by Bishop of Newcastle Jack Stretch.

The Darling Downs, including Cambooya, was well known for the production of cheese and other dairy products in the first half of the 20th century. For example, the Ramsay Cheese Factory, during the fourteen months prior to the end of 1906, made 248,686 lb or 111 tons of cheese from 273,003 gallons of milk.  By 1912 there were butter an/or cheese factories at Allora, Cambooya, Clifton, Crows Nest, Dalby, Goombungee, Greenmount, Inglewood, Jandowae, Leyburn, Oakey, Pittsworth, Tannymorel, Toowoomba and Warwick. In the late 1930s the Downs' dairy industry peaked at 6500 farms and over 200,000 milking cows.

On Wednesday 6 June 1906 the Cambooya Presbyterian Church was officially opened by the Moderator the Right Reverend James McQueen. It was made of wood by contractor Mr Smith of Toowoomba.

The post office, railway station building and goods shed were destroyed in a fire in the early hours of the morning on 7 July 1908. A new post office was built in 1909 at an estimated cost of £1050. 

Nunkulla State School opened on 1912 "via Cambooya" and was closed on 6 December 1959, and the building was transported to Cambooya to become an additional classroom at Cambooya State School. The "new" building was officially opened in December 1960. A new building was constructed in 1985 and officially opened on 3 August 1985 by Tony Elliott, Member for Cunningham. In 1985 the school was officially given six allotments of land, now called Johnson Oval. This oval is used today for cricket, soccer, and athletics. By 1990 there were 104 students and 25 pre-school students enrolled, plus a teaching staff of six teachers and three teacher-aides. Early in 2005 there was an officially opened covered area. Stuart Copeland, Member of Parliament (MP) congratulated the school community for constructing a useful covered area for eating lunches and undercover activities. The school celebrated its centenary in 1982 and 125 years of education at Cambooya State School in 2007.

In April 1914, the Anglican Church at Cambooya was destroyed by cyclonic winds.  As reported in the Darling Downs Gazette, "the church was built by the residents some years ago, and was one of the centres of religious life in that small community. A stained glass window in the church was the gift of Sir Arthur Hodgson in memory of the Hodgson family who did much for the Downs and for Queensland; the walls of the little church were beautifully decorated. The seats were tastefully decorated, and the organ, recently paid for, was a very fine instrument. All have been destroyed." The church was rebuilt with funds raised by the community. The foundation stone of the new building was laid on Wednesday 4 November 1914 by Archdeacon Henry Le Fanu, a week before the opening of the new Catholic church. On Sunday 7 November 1915 the new All Saints Anglican Church was officially dedicated by Archbishop St Clair Donaldson.

In October 1913 local Catholics decided to erect a Catholic church in Cambooya. On Sunday 9 August 1914 local priest Father O'Connell performed the stamp capping ceremony for the new church. The church was designed by Harry Marks of Toowoomba and the contractors were Messrs Heiner and Olsen.  The Cambooya Catholic Church was officially opened on 9 November 1914 by Archbishop James Duhig, before a crowd of about 600. On Sunday 25 April (ANZAC Day) 1965 a new brick church building was officially opened and blessed by Bishop of Toowoomba William Brennan. The new church is adjacent to the old wooden church. At the centenary celebrations in 2014, descendants of the men who helped build the church were among the crowd for the celebration.

A suburban rail motor service from Toowoomba along the Southern railway line commenced in May 1917, running to Wyreema, 10 miles away. It was extended to Cambooya and to Willowburn in 1918. They ceased around 1923.

The Cambooya War Memorial was unveiled on Sunday 9 October 1921 by William Bebbington, the local Member of the Queensland Legislative Assembly.In February 1923 a branch of the Queensland Country Women's Association was formed in Cambooya. More than 50 women attended the meeting. Ruth Fairfax (Queensland president and founder) referred to the "good work than the association could accomplish among country women, emphasis being laid "on what could be done in Cambooya and district. The newly formed branch agreed to devote its energies to assisting the Bush Nursing Association. Ruth Fairfax was elected president, and Miss Middleton secretary and treasurer." There is no longer a branch in Cambooya, although there are a number of branches in the surrounding area, including Toowoomba and Middle Ridge.

In the  the locality of Cambooya had a population of 1,584 people.

Heritage listings 

Cambooya has a number of heritage-listed sites, including:
 New England Highway: Eton Vale Homestead Ruins

Economy 
There are a number of homesteads in the locality:

 Airton Vale
 Barnaline
 Barnool
 Braeside
 Bri Bri
 Clemsrese
 Cottonwood Park
 Harrow
 Hillside
 Kerrianvale
 Kilmacrane
 Kinroydy
 Marinya
 Mountside
 Quean
 Rocky Park
 Worrah

Education 
Cambooya State School is a government primary (Prep-6) school for boys and girls at Harrow Street. In 2018, the school had an enrolment of 167 students with 10 teachers (8 full-time equivalent) and 9 non-teaching staff (6 full-time equivalent).

There are no secondary schools in Cambooya. The nearest government secondary schools are Harristown State High School in Harristown, Toowoomba, to the north-east, Centenary Heights State High School in Centenary Heights, Toowoomba, to the north-east, Clifton State High School in Clifton to the south, and Pittsworth State High School in Pittsworth to the west.

Facilities 
Cambooya Police Station is at 18 Quarry Street, enter via Gray Street.

Cambooya SES is on George Street north of the junction with Ernest Street.

Cambooya Post Office is located at 53 Eton Street.

Amenities
Library services in Cambooya are provided by the Toowoomba Regional Council's mobile library service. The van visits Cambooya State School every Friday.

All Saints Anglican Church is at 12 Eton Street.

Sacred Heart Catholic Church is at 11 Eton Street with the former wooden church beside it.

Cambooya Uniting Church is at 19 Eton Street.

Attractions
Cambooya has an historic pub called the Bull and Barley at 61 Eton Street. It has been featured on the television show Getaway. Originally opened in 1902 as the Cambooya Railway Hotel, it was one of three pubs in the town, but now it is the only hotel in Cambooya. The name was changed to the Bull and Barley Inn in 1978.

Across the road from the pub is the Coominya War Memorial in the Memorial Park.

Notable people 
 Arthur Hoey Davis, famous poet and writer known as Steele Rudd; lived in the district
 Ruth Fairfax, founder of the Queensland Country Women's Association; lived in Cambooya from her marriage until 1931
 Sir Arthur Hodgson KCMG, pioneer settler and prominent politician

Climate

References

External links

 
 

Towns in Queensland
Towns in the Darling Downs
Toowoomba Region
Localities in Queensland